Abdon is a former civil parish, now in the parish of Abdon and Heath, in Shropshire, England, and includes the settlements of Abdon, Tugford, Beambridge, and Holdgate.  It contains 22 listed buildings that are recorded in the National Heritage List for England. Of these, one is listed at Grade I, the highest of the three grades, three are at Grade II*, the middle grade, and the others are at Grade II, the lowest grade.  The parish is entirely rural.  Most of the listed buildings are churches and associated structures in the churchyards.  The other listed buildings consist of houses, a former mill and stables, a bridge, and a telephone kiosk.


Key

Buildings

References

Citations

Sources

Lists of buildings and structures in Shropshire